{{DISPLAYTITLE:C2Cl3F3}}
The molecular formula C2Cl3F3 (molar mass: 187.38 g/mol, exact mass: 185.9018 u) may refer to:

 1,1,1-Trichloro-2,2,2-trifluoroethane
 1,1,2-Trichloro-1,2,2-trifluoroethane, or CFC-113